Essex House is a Los Angeles publishing imprint, a subsidiary of Milton Luros's Parliament News, Inc, which between 1968 and 1969, published 37 erotica novels. About half the 37 titles published by Essex House were sci-fi/fantasy; the authors published include Philip José Farmer, David Meltzer, Michael Perkins, Jean Marie Stine, Charles Bukowski.

Bibliography
 Paul V. Dallas, Binding with Briars, 1968
 Richard E. Geis, Ravished, 1968
 Philip José Farmer, Image of the Beast, 1968
 Michael Perkins, Blue Movie, 1968
 David Meltzer, The Agency, 1968
 David Meltzer, The Agent, 1968
 David Meltzer How Many Blocks in the Pile, 1968
 David Meltzer, Orf, 1968
 Michael Perkins, Down Here, 1968
 Michael Perkins, Evil companions, 1968
 Michael Perkins, Queen of Heat, 1968
 Gil Porter, Coupled, 1968
 Jerry Anderson, Trans, 1969
 Gary Bradbrook, Get It On!, 1969
 Charles Bukowski, Notes of a Dirty Old Man, 1969
 P. N. Dedeaux, The Nothing Things, 1969
 P. N. Dedeaux, Tender Buns, 1969
 Philip José Farmer, Blown, 1969
 Philip José Farmer, A Feast Unknown, 1969
 Jane Gallion, Biker, 1969
 Richard E. Geis, Raw Meat, 1969
 Gil Lamont, Roach, 1969
 Michael Macpherson, Abducted, 1969
 Alan S. Marlowe, Over Easy, 1969
 David Meltzer, Glue Factory, 1969
 David Meltzer, Healer, 1969
 David Meltzer, Lovely, 1969
 David Meltzer, The Martyr, 1969
 David Meltzer, Out, 1969
 Michael Perkins, Estelle, 1969
 Michael Perkins, Terminus, 1969
 Michael Perkins, Whacking Off, 1969
 Alice Louise Ramirez, The Geek, 1969	
 Hank Stine, Thrill City, 1969
 Hank Stine, Season of the Witch, 1969
 Henry Toledano, The Bitter Seed, 1969	
 Henry Toledano, A Sort of Justice, 1969

References

External links 
 
 
 

Defunct book publishing companies of the United States
Book publishing companies based in California
Publishing companies established in 1968
Publishing companies disestablished in 1969